Hammer Creek is a  tributary of Cocalico Creek in Lebanon and Lancaster Counties, Pennsylvania in the United States.

Hammer Creek is dammed to form Speedwell Forge Lake before joining the Cocalico Creek downstream by the confluence of Middle Creek near the village of Rothsville.

Variant names
According to the Geographic Names Information System, Hammer Creek has also been known historically as Hammar Creek.

Bridges
Brunnerville Road Bridge over Hammer Creek
Erb's Covered Bridge

Notable people

 Bishop Benjamin Eby (1785–1853)

See also
List of rivers of Pennsylvania
John Fass and the Hammer Creek Press

References

Rivers of Pennsylvania
Tributaries of the Conestoga River
Rivers of Lancaster County, Pennsylvania
Rivers of Lebanon County, Pennsylvania